The 1960 Colgate Red Raiders football team was an American football team that represented Colgate University as an independent during the 1960 NCAA University Division football season. Head coach Alva Kelley returned for his second year, leading the team to an identical 2–7 record. John Maloney was the team captain.

The team played its home games at Colgate Athletic Field in Hamilton, New York.

Schedule

Leading players 
Statistical leaders for the 1960 Red Raiders included: 
 Rushing: John Maloney, 330 yards and 5 touchdowns on 65 attempts
 Passing: Robert Paske, 319 yards, 19 completions and 2 touchdowns on 51 attempts
 Receiving: John Smith, 235 yards and 2 touchdowns on 17 receptions
 Total offense: Daniel Keating, 495 yards (264 passing, 231 rushing)
 Scoring: John Maloney, 30 points from 5 touchdowns
 All-purpose yards: Jacque MacKinnon, 814 yards (324 rushing, 206 receiving, 167 kickoff returning, 99 interception returning, 18 punt returning)

References

Colgate
Colgate Raiders football seasons
Colgate Red Raiders football